Thomas McKenna (11 November 1919 – December 2008) was a Scottish professional footballer who played as a wing half.

References

1919 births
2008 deaths
Footballers from Paisley, Renfrewshire
Scottish footballers
Association football wing halves
St Mirren F.C. players
Reading F.C. players
Grimsby Town F.C. players
Chelmsford City F.C. players
English Football League players